Samal may refer to:

Cultures
 The Sama languages of the Sulu Archipelago 
 The ethnic groups that speak this language (including the Banguingui), see Sama-Bajau peoples

People
 Jayiram Samal, an Indian comic actor
 Sámal Joensen-Mikines, a Faroese painter
 Sámal Johansen, a Faroese editor
 Sámal Pætursson Lamhauge, Prime Minister of the Faroe Islands from 1706 to 1752
 Samal Saeed, an Iraqi footballer

Places

Iran
Samal, Iran, a village in Bushehr Province, Iran
Samal-e Jonubi, a village in Bushehr Province, Iran
Samal-e Shomali, a village in Bushehr Province, Iran

Philippines
 Samal, Davao del Norte, an island city in Davao del Norte
 Samar Island Natural Park
 Samal, Bataan, a municipality in Bataan

Turkey
 Sam'al, an ancient Hittite city, now the Zincirli archaeological site in southern Turkey

Other
 Samal, the rank of sergeant in the Israel Defense Forces

Language and nationality disambiguation pages